Miasma is an EP by the British band Hecate Enthroned that was released on 4 July 2001 via Blackend Records. It has six tracks, one of which is a hidden bonus cover of Venom's "Buried Alive".

Miasma is also the last release by Hecate Enthroned to feature keyboardist Darren "Daz" Bishop.

Track listing

Personnel
 Hecate Enthroned
 Dean Seddon – vocals
 Andy Milnes – guitar
 Nigel Dennen – guitar
 Darren Bishop – keyboards
 Dylan Hughes – bass
 Rob Kendrick – drums, percussion

 Miscellaneous staff
 Pete "Pee-Wee" Coleman – production, engineering

References 

2001 EPs
Hecate Enthroned albums
Demo albums